is a Japanese professional boxer. He is a five-time mini-flyweight world champion, having held the WBC title in 2005, the IBF title twice between 2013 and 2015, and the WBO title twice between 2014 and 2017. He retired as a professional in 2017, as WBO world champion, to focus on participation in the 2020 Olympics, but returned in 2020 after failing to qualify.

Early life 
Takayama weighed about 60 kg at the age of twelve. He started playing rugby and athletics, but did not last long. It was in summer in the second grade of junior high school that his friend brought him to a boxing gym. When he got started on the punching bag, despite he said he is going to be a world champion, he could not do more than three push-ups in a row. Even after his own workout, he had been watching senior boxers' sparring sessions and trainees' training.

Professional boxing career 
Takayama made his professional debut in October 2000 and won the All-Japan Rookie King Tournament in December 2001.

Japan

WBC title 
On April 4, 2005 Takayama defeated Isaac Bustos for the WBC world title, by a unanimous decision. This victory gave Takayama the distinction of being the 50th Japanese fighter to win a world title. However, he lost a next bout against Eagle Kyowa by a unanimous decision, on August 6, 2005.

Interim WBA title 
On November 7, 2006 he defeated Carlos Melo for the WBA interim title when he was originally supposed to face Yutaka Niida for the WBA title in September. However, due to a costal cartilage fracture Niida sustained from sparring, the fight would be delayed to April 7, 2007 ending in a split decision loss. After the fight, his then manager rejected the decision and uttered that it was a match fixing and that he would make civil litigation. However, he visited the JBC (Japan Boxing Commission) two days later and apologized for his rant saying that he had just wanted to pat his boxer on the back. Furthermore, most of the purse for that fight had not been paid. Although Takayama and Nakade announced that they would transfer to any other gym, the matters on the match fee and transfer fee were not resolved over months.

Takayama got another world title shot on July 14, 2009. This time, it was for the WBA minimumweight title which is held by Roman Gonzalez. Unsuccessfully, Takayama lost on all judges. He retired as a JBC-licensed boxer to fight for the WBO and IBF's titles in late 2009. At that time the JBC had approved no fight for the WBO and IBF's titles, but conditionally allowed them from February 28, 2011. That is because the West Japan Boxing Association to which Takayama and Ken'ichi Yamaguchi belonged strongly urged reform of the system after they issued retirement notices.

Away from Japan 
Takayama then trained at his fellow boxer Ken'ichi Yamaguchi's Osaka Tenjin Boxing Gym in Japan and ALA Boxing Gym in the Philippines, and was promoted by ALA Promotions since April 2010.

He won an IBF minimumweight title eliminator via a sixth round technical knockout at the Carnival City in Brakpan, Gauteng, South Africa in September 2010. He challenged Nkosinathi Joyi for that title at the Carnival City on January 29, 2011 after being postponed twice, but the fight ended in a no-contest due to a cut on Takayama's head after an accidental head-butt in the third round. He had a broken right hand since just before the fight.

Takayama rematched Joyi at the Orient Theatre in East London, Eastern Cape after postponed four times on March 30, 2012. It was the SABC-televised second boxing event after one year interruption. According to Japanese sources, Takayama reportedly dominated the whole fight except that he went down resulting from a slip in the fifth round, and stated with increased confidence through the twelve rounds that "I fought as was planned and did my best" after a unanimous decision loss with scores of 111–116 twice and 110–117. A boxing writer for South Africa's SuperSport wrote that "Many ringsiders were of the opinion that the decision could have gone in favour of the challenger" on Fightnews.com which was presented the WBA’s Website of the Year in 2010. In addition, there were several articles showing that Joyi had struggled against Takayama. However the IBF's Lindsey Tucker has denied their views on BoxingScene.com.

He fought against Filipino Mateo Handig for the vacant IBF Pan Pacific mini flyweight title and the mandatory challenger status to the IBF mini flyweight title in La Trinidad, Benguet, Philippines on October 13, 2012. But he lost the fight via a split decision after being deducted a point in the fourth round for pushing. Two Filipino judges scored the fight 114–113 for Handig, while the other Thai judge scored it 115–112 for Takayama. The IBF ordered a rematch due to the inadequacy of the mandatory drug testing before and after the fight. After Handig's injury, Takayama earned the right to challenge for the world title.

IBF title 
Takayama defeated Mario Rodríguez via a unanimous decision with the scores of 119–109, 117–111 and 115–113 to be crowned the IBF mini flyweight world champion at the Estadio Francisco Carranza Limón in Guasave, Sinaloa, Mexico on March 30, 2013. He was the first foreign boxer for ALA Promotions, and became the third ever world champion for them. "I'm gonna float like a butterfly and sting like a bee," Takayama had told at the pre-fight conference. He tried to imitate the Ali shuffle during the fight.

Return to Japan 
The JBC joined the WBO and the IBF on April 1, 2013. After more than four years' absence from the ring in Japan, Takayama's boxer's license was issued again by the JBC on July 12, 2013. He registered with Nakazato Boxing Gym to defend his title against Vergilio Silvano via a unanimous decision at the Bodymaker Colosseum in Osaka on December 3, 2013.

While Takayama has gone through five gyms, his Japanese trainer for his entire career is Hiroaki Nakade who has so far served as the second/trainer in the world title bouts of all the four major sanctioning bodies i.e. the WBA, WBC, IBF (for Takayama fights) and WBO (for Orlando Salido vs. Yamaguchi).

Professional boxing record

See also 
 List of WBC world champions
 List of IBF world champions
 List of Mini-flyweight boxing champions
 List of Japanese boxing world champions
 Boxing in Japan

References

Video references

Bibliography

External links 
 
 

1983 births
Living people
Mini-flyweight boxers
World mini-flyweight boxing champions
World Boxing Council champions
World Boxing Association champions
International Boxing Federation champions
Japanese male boxers
Sportspeople from Osaka